In mathematics, specifically measure theory, the counting measure is an intuitive way to put a measure on any set – the "size" of a subset is taken to be the number of elements in the subset if the subset has finitely many elements, and infinity  if the subset is infinite.

The counting measure can be defined on any measurable space (that is, any set  along with a sigma-algebra)  but is mostly used on countable sets.

Then the counting measure  on this measurable space  is the positive measure  defined by

for all  where  denotes the cardinality of the set 

Discussion

The counting measure is a special case of a more general construction.  With the notation as above, any function  defines a measure  on  via

where the possibly uncountable sum of real numbers is defined to be the supremum of the sums over all finite subsets, that is, 

Taking  for all  gives the counting measure.

See also

References

Measures (measure theory)